The 1983–84 Long Island Blackbirds men's basketball team represented Long Island University during the 1983–84 NCAA Division I men's basketball season. The Blackbirds, led by head coach Paul Lizzo, played their home games at the Athletic, Recreation & Wellness Center and were members of the ECAC Metro Conference. They finished the season 20–11, 11–5 in ECAC-M play to capture the regular season championship. They also won the ECAC Metro tournament to earn an automatic bid in the 1984 NCAA tournament where they lost in the play-in round to Northeastern, 90–87.

Roster

Schedule and results
 
|-
!colspan=9 style=| Regular season

|-
!colspan=9 style=| ECAC Metro tournament

|-
!colspan=9 style=| NCAA tournament

,

References

Long Island
Long Island
LIU Brooklyn Blackbirds men's basketball seasons
Long Island Blackbirds men's b
Long Island Blackbirds men's b